Sigurd Overby (November 14, 1899 – April 12, 1979) was an American skier from Wisconsin. He was the American champion in cross-country skiing three times, first in 1916. He competed in cross-country skiing and Nordic combined at the 1924 Winter Olympics in Chamonix.

References

External links
 

1899 births
1979 deaths
Sportspeople from Wisconsin
American male Nordic combined skiers
American male cross-country skiers
Olympic Nordic combined skiers of the United States
Olympic cross-country skiers of the United States
Nordic combined skiers at the 1924 Winter Olympics
Cross-country skiers at the 1924 Winter Olympics
20th-century American people